The Yeropol is a river in Chukotka Autonomous Okrug, Russia.

The Yeropol is a right tributary of the Anadyr and its basin is in a mountainous area of Chukotka. The village of Chuvanskoye is located in the middle course of the river. The name of the river originated in the Yukaghir language.

History 
The Yeropol river was known to Russian explorers since the 17th century.

In 1984 two archeological sites were discovered in the upper reaches of the Yeropol. There are remains of different eras, ranging from the Mesolithic to the Neolithic.

Course
The river heads first southeastwards in its upper course, then it bends and flows in a steady ENE direction until its mouth. In its last stretch it enters a plain bound by mountains on both sides, where it divides into multiple branches. Finally it joins the right bank of the Anadyr a little downstream from the mouth of the Yablon,  from its mouth.

The river and its tributaries are frozen for between eight and nine months every year.

See also
List of rivers of Russia

References

External links
Anadyr - Freshwater Ecoregions of the World

Rivers of Chukotka Autonomous Okrug